The 1992 William & Mary Tribe football team represented the College of William & Mary as an independent during the 1992 NCAA Division I-AA football season. Led by Jimmye Laycock in his 13th year as head coach, William & Mary finished the season with a record of 9–2 and ranked No. 13 in the final NCAA Division I-AA Football Committee poll.

Schedule

References

William and Mary
William & Mary Tribe football seasons
William and Mary Indians football